Shanhe Subdistrict is a subdistrict in Shuangyang District, Changchun, Jilin, China. , it has 2 residential communities and 25 villages under its administration.

See also 
 List of township-level divisions of Jilin

References 

Township-level divisions of Jilin
Changchun